A Soap Bubble and Inertia is the debut album by Canadian alternative rock band The Gandharvas. It was released in 1994 on the Thermometer Sound Surface record label. The album featured three singles; "The First Day of Spring", "The Coffee Song" and "Shadow", all which had music videos. By April 1998, the album had sold over 35,000 copies.

The album's title is taken from a line in the novel Notes from Underground by Fyodor Dostoevsky.

The album's single, "The First Day of Spring," was named Song of the Year for 1994 (CASBY Award) by The Edge 102.1 in Toronto, Ontario.  In 2007 the same radio station ranked the song #14 in their "Top 102 Canadian New Rock Songs of All Time" list.

Track listing
All tracks by The Gandharvas (Lyrics - Paul Jago)

"The First Day of Spring" – 4:25
"Saturn Quits Fasting" – 3:58
"The Coffee Song" – 3:20
"Bundle" – 4:20
"Beakfulls of Heroin" – 4:48
"Shadow" – 4:40
"The Supreme Personality" – 4:18
"Dallying" – 4:24
"Cans"  (instrumental) – 2:55
"Soap Bubble Meets Inertia" – 8:02
"Elevator Bugs" – 3:12
"Circus Song"  (instrumental) – 2:40

Personnel
Paul Jago – vocals, piano, cans
Brian Ward – guitar, E-bow, piano
Jud Ruhl – guitar, piano
Tim McDonald – drums, percussion
Eric Howden – bass, vocals
Rob Blanchette – bass
Noel Jago – percussion, backing vocals
Dan Brodbeck – producer, engineering, mixing, accordion, tuba, drum programming, percussion, backing vocals
Anthony Hudson – drum programming
Alun Piggins – mixing
Irene Gotz – artwork
David Hayes – design, layout
Andrew MacNaughtan – photography

References

External links
A Soap Bubble and Inertia at the CHRW-FM London Music Archives

1994 debut albums
The Gandharvas albums